Daga Post is a city in northeastern South Sudan on the Daga River, near the border with Ethiopia. It lies on the same longitude as Addis Ababa, the Ethiopian capital.

Populated places in Upper Nile (state)
Greater Upper Nile